The extreme points of Vietnam include the northernmost, southernmost, easternmost, and westernmost locations in Vietnam's territory, as well as the highest and the lowest altitudes in Vietnam. Because Vietnam is located in the eastern Indochinese Peninsula, the northernmost point and the westernmost point both lie on the land, and there are two southernmost points and two easternmost points along and inside the South China Sea. Vietnam stretches along the coast of the South China Sea, with the northernmost point being more than 1,650 km from the southernmost. Most extreme points are not in dispute with any other countries; only one extreme point, Tennent Reef, is disputed by China, Taiwan, and the Philippines as a part of the Spratly Islands dispute (though Tennent Reef is currently administered by Vietnam). 

The latitude and longitude are expressed in decimal degree notation, in which a positive latitude value refers to the northern hemisphere, and a negative value refers to the southern hemisphere. Similarly, a positive longitude value refers to the eastern hemisphere, and a negative value refers to the western hemisphere. The coordinates used in this article are sourced from Google Earth, which makes use of the WGS84 geodetic reference system. Additionally, a negative altitude value refers to land below sea level.

Extreme points

Color Notes
 (2)
 (2)
 (2)

Altitudes

See also
Geography of Vietnam
Extreme points of Asia
List of extreme points of India
List of extreme points of Japan

Notes

References

Four Extreme Points Of Vietnam (Part 1)
Four Extreme Points Of Vietnam (Part 2)

Vietnam
Extreme points